Beyond the Calm of the Corridor was the only album The Blank Theory released on New Line Records. It featured 13 tracks in total and was produced by Adam Schlesinger of Fountains of Wayne and Ivy fame. Co-Producer James Iha (Smashing Pumpkins), contributed his guitar works on "Killing Me". The album also features a cover of Portishead's "Sour Times". Some resources online include The Beatles' "Hey, Bulldog" listed as a 14th track as well.

The lead single, "Middle Of Nowhere", reached #36 on the US Mainstream Rock Tracks Chart. It was featured in the film Final Destination 2 as well as appearing on Freddy vs. Jason: The Original Motion Picture Soundtrack, both in 2003.

Track listing

References

2002 albums
The Blank Theory albums
New Line Records albums